Aise, is an instrumental dance tune common throughout the eastern Mediterranean. Sections of its melody are found as part of “Selanik”(“Thessalonikê”), a tune from Macedonia; in apiece by the Ottoman Armenian composer Tatyos Efendi; and in the song, “Love’s Like a Pin,”from Asia Minor and Propontis (for a recording, see Songs and Tunes of Thrace, CUP CD 7-8, 1:3). What was probably the first recording has also been identified: a 78 made in Cairo in 1910 under the title, “Bulbul Al-Afrah” (“The Happy Nightingale”), with the Jewish musician Ibrahim Sahalun ’s Takht on violin. In Lesvos, the tune is called “Aisé” (a Turkish female name). It may have had lyrics at some point in the past and was most commonly performed in the west of the island.

The tune is characteristic of the petachtos karsilamas- an entire category of dance performed to tunes with a very rapid time signature (although today, thanks to the choreographic intervention of the dance association, it is presented as a “chair dance”). This type of karsilamas is also called aïdinikos (see the section on dance), and the rhythm has nine beats (2+2+2+3).There are similar folkloric tunes known as Gel Gel Aman.

Turkish

Suzan Yakar Rutkay Lyrics
Atımı bağladım ben bir ormana
Benden selam söylede çapkın oğlana

Oğlan gıdı gıdıdagel gel gel gel
Eller sarar ah yüreğime dert olur

Atımı bağladım ben bir meşeye
Benden selam söylede çapkın Ayşe'ye

Ayşem gıdı gıdıdagel gel gel gel
Eller sarar ah yüreğime dert olur.

Greek

Kiria Koula Lyrics
Σε περίμενα βραδάκι 
αχ, να μη ιδείς μην είμαι εδώ

λες και μ’ έχει αποθαμένο
αχ, λέγε με και ζωντανό

αχ, λέγε με και ζωντανό

-Αχ, γιάλα γιάλα!
-Γκελ, γκελ, γκελ, γκελ, γκελ!

μαύρα μάτια έχεις, φως μου
μαύρα είναι σαν την ελιά

κι όποιος τα γλυκοφιλήσει
αχ, Χάρο δεν φοβάται πια

αχ, Χάρο δεν φοβάται πια

-Γιάλα!
-Γκελ, γκελ, γκελ, γκελ!
-Ωχ, γιάλα γιάλα γιάλα!
-Γεια σου Θανάση Μακεδόνε, γεια σου!

See also
Karsilamas
Yaman Ayşem
Aydın Karşılaması

References

External links

European folk dances
Greek dances
Greek songs
Turkish dances
Turkish songs
Year of song unknown
Songwriter unknown